Bilyal Valerievich Makhov (born 20 September 1987 in Nalchik) is a Russian mixed martial artist, freestyle and Greco-Roman wrestler. He is signed to the Ultimate Fighting Championship, currently competing in the Heavyweight division. He was the Russian champion in 2007 and 2010, European champion in 2010 and World champion in 2007, 2009 and 2010 in Men's Freestyle 120 kg wrestling and bronze medalist in 130 kg Greco-Roman Wrestling at the World Championships in 2014 and 2015.  In 2015, he won the Russian National Greco-Roman Wrestling Championships

He originally won the bronze medal at the 2012 Summer Olympics in the men's 120 kg category but was upgraded to joint gold medallist with Komeil Ghasemi of Iran in 2020, when retesting of samples revealed both finalists had used illegal substances. In September 2021, Makhov was himself banned for four years after an anti-doping violation.

Ultimate Fighting Championship
On April 25, 2015, it was announced that Makhov had signed with the Ultimate Fighting Championship to compete in the heavyweight division. Makhov decided to continue to wrestle in the hope to medal at the 2016 Summer Olympics in Rio de Janeiro. After the 2016 Summer Olympics, Makhov did not fight in the UFC due to long-term health issues caused by a mercury poisoning he had suffered in 2008.

Championships and accomplishments

International Titles
 Freestyle:
 2007 World Champion – 120 kg (Baku, Azerbaijan)
 2008 Golden Grand-Prix Ivan Yarygin 3rd – 120 kg (Krasnoyarsk, Russia)
 2009 World Champion – 120 kg (Herning, Denmark)
 2010 European Champion – 120 kg (Baku, Azerbaijan)
 2010 World Champion – 120 kg (Moscow, Russia)
 2011 World Championships runner-up – 120 kg (Istanbul, Turkey)
 2012 Olympic Silver Medalist – 120 kg (London, England)
 2015 Ali Aliyev Memorial winner – 125 kg (Kaspiysk, Dagestan)
 2015 World Championships Bronze Medalist – 125 kg (Las Vegas, United States)
 Greco-Roman:
 2014 World Championships Bronze Medalist – 130 kg (Tashkent, Uzbekistan)
 2015 World Championships Bronze Medalist – 130 kg (Las Vegas, United States)

International accomplishments
The first wrestler in 42 years  to win a medal at the world championships in both freestyle and Greco-Roman (the last person to accomplish this was Jan Karlsson in 1973).

National Titles
 Freestyle:
 2006 Russian National Runner-up – 120 kg  (Nizhnevartovsk, Yugra)
 2007 Russian National Champion – 120 kg  (Moscow)
 2008 Russian National Bronze Medalist – 120 kg  (Saint Petersburg, Leningrad)
 2009 Russian National Champion – 120 kg  (Kazan, Tatarstan)
 2010 Russian National Champion – 120 kg  (Volgograd)
 2012 Russian National Champion – 120 kg  (Saint Petersburg, Leningrad)
 Greco-Roman:
 2015 Russian National Champion – 130 kg  (Saint Petersburg, Leningrad)
 2016 Russian Nationals bronze medalist – 130 kg  (Grozny, Chechnya)

References

External links
 

Living people
Russian male sport wrestlers
1987 births
Olympic gold medalists for Russia
Wrestlers at the 2012 Summer Olympics
Olympic wrestlers of Russia
Sportspeople from Nalchik
Circassian people of Russia
Olympic medalists in wrestling
Medalists at the 2012 Summer Olympics
World Wrestling Championships medalists
Wrestlers at the 2016 Summer Olympics
Russian sportspeople in doping cases